The individual eventing at the 1956 Summer Olympics took place between 11 and 14 June, at the Stockholm Olympic Stadium. Eventing was open to men only. It was the 9th appearance of the event.

Competition format
The team and individual eventing competitions used the same results. Eventing consisted of a dressage test, a cross-country test, and a jumping test. The competitor with the best total score (fewest penalty points) won.

 Dressage: The eventing competition featured a dressage test. Five judges gave scores.
 Cross-country: The cross-country test had five phases.
 Phase A: 7.2 km roads. Time allowed was 30 minutes (240 m/min). 
 Phase B: 3.6 km steeplechase. Time allowed was 6 minutes (600 m/min). 
 Phase C: 14.4 km roads. Time allowed was 60 minutes (240 m/min). 
 Phase D: 7.65 km cross-country. Time allowed was 17 minutes (450 m/min). There were 33 obstacles.
 Phase E: 2 km flat. Time allowed was 6 minutes (333 m/min). 
 Jumping: The jumping test had 12 obstacles.

Results

56 riders competed.

Standings after dressage

Standings after cross-country

Final results after jumping

References

Equestrian at the 1956 Summer Olympics